Good is an unincorporated community in northeastern Hampshire County, West Virginia, United States atop Bear Garden Mountain. Good is located on the Bloomery Pike (West Virginia Route 127) at I.L. Pugh Road (West Virginia Secondary Route 6/2) east of Bloomery and northwest of Winchester on the West Virginia/Virginia border. Good partly lies in Frederick County, Virginia.

Historic site
Laurel Hill Church, WV 127 at I.L. Pugh Road

References

Unincorporated communities in Hampshire County, West Virginia
Unincorporated communities in West Virginia